Pamela Rosalind Grace Coddington (born 20 April 1941) is a Welsh former model and former creative director at large of American Vogue magazine. Coddington is known for the creation of large, complex and dramatic photoshoots. A Guardian profile wrote that she "has produced some of fashion's most memorable imagery. Her pictures might be jolly and decadent or moody and mysterious."

Early life 
Coddington was born on the island of Anglesey in Wales, United Kingdom, to hotelier parents. Her interest in fashion began in her teens, when she would anxiously await the arrival of a current issue of Vogue magazine, which was at least three months outdated because she needed to order it on "rush-copy". Coddington lived many miles away from any designer shops, so Vogue was her only connection to the fashion world. She says that she loves "the whole sort of chic thing ("Italianate culture") [about Vogue] that was so entirely out of context compared to the lifestyle that [she] led." As a teen, she was pale-skinned, convent-educated and never went anywhere on her holidays, so she just looked at Vogue.

Career

Modeling 
In 1959 at the age of 18, there was a Vogue model competition, and someone submitted her pictures. She ended up winning the Young Model section and was featured in the October issue in a photograph by Norman Parkinson. She then began her modelling career for Vogue.

At the age of 26, she was in a car accident that left her with head injuries and a removed eyelid, which was later reconstructed through plastic surgery.

Editor 
Two years after the accident she was interviewed by British Vogue's Editor Beatrix Miller, and was employed as a Junior Editor. After 19 years as Photo Editor with British Vogue, she moved to New York City to work for Calvin Klein. In July 1988, she joined Anna Wintour at American Vogue, where she worked as the magazine's creative director.

In January 2016, Coddington announced that she would be exiting her role as creative director at Vogue to pursue other projects. It was announced on 9 May 2016 that Coddington would be working with Tiffany & Co.

Later that year, Coddington's new campaign for Tiffany & Co. A/W 16, featuring Elle Fanning launched. The campaign was sparse of product shots and traditional models. With direction from Coddington, Tiffany opted instead to feature celebrities and close up imagery of the jewelry styled on the body.

In 2018, Coddington also partnered with Louis Vuitton on a capsule collection, featuring many designs incorporating her cats.

The September Issue
Coddington came into the public eye in 2009 with the release of The September Issue, a fly-on-the-wall documentary about the making of the September 2007 issue of Vogue. She plays a prominent role in the film as she is heavily involved in the styling and production of the issue. Her often-tense relationship with editor Anna Wintour is also highlighted.

Popular culture 
In the season 3 of the anthology series American Horror Story, American actress Frances Conroy interprets the iconic Myrtle Snow. The character's red hair, as well as her passion for fashion, are considered as a tribute to the ex-model Grace Coddington.

Personal life
Coddington was married in 1968 to Michael Chow, a restaurateur. They divorced a year later. She later married the photographer Willie Christie. They divorced in 1980.

She raised her nephew Tristan from the age of eight, after the death of her sister Rosemary.

In 1986, she moved to New York City to work for Calvin Klein. She has since then lived with her partner, hair stylist Didier Malige, and several cats.

In 2010, she announced plans to write a memoir with her collaborator Jay Fielden. The two had previously worked together on the 2002 photo book, Grace: Thirty Years of Fashion at Vogue. The book was reissued by Phaidon in 2015. After Fielden took a job as the editor of Town & Country, Coddington had to postpone writing the book until 2011, after she decided to write it with Michael Roberts. The book deal is reported to have been worth $US1.2 million. Her memoir, Grace, was published in November 2012. In 2015, film production company A24 optioned the rights to Coddington's memoir.

Works and publications 
  – first volume of collected work 
 
 
 
 
 
 
  – second and final volume of collected work 
 
  – combined volumes one and two of collected work

References

Further reading

External links 

 
 
 Face to Grace at Made to Measure
 

1941 births
Living people
20th-century Welsh people
21st-century Welsh writers
21st-century Welsh women writers
Vogue (magazine) people
Fashion editors
Fashion stylists
Welsh memoirists
People from Anglesey
Welsh female models
British women memoirists
Women magazine editors
Creative directors
Tiffany & Co.
Welsh expatriates in the United States